The Art of Nijinsky is a 1913 book written by Geoffrey Whitworth which analyzes the art of Vaslav Nijinsky. At 110 pages, it features 10 colored illustrations by Dorothy Mullock,

The watercolor illustrations by Mullock, have been called "remarkable." The text, itself called "enthusiastic," examines the career of Nijinsky in both the art-form and choreography, as well as appreciating Nijinsky's achievements. It also touches on the history of Russian ballet and related literature. In 1914, The Art of Nijinsky sold for $1.10, and it is considered to be the "first book to appear in appreciation of his art." However, Edward Gordon Craig felt that the book was unnecessary, stating that "the art of Nijinsky is no art."

References

Sources

External links

1913 books
Chatto & Windus books